The Métropole Toulon Provence Méditerranée is the métropole, an intercommunal structure, centred on the city of Toulon. It is located in the Var department, in the Provence-Alpes-Côte d'Azur region, southeastern France. It was created in January 2018, replacing the communauté d'agglomération that had been created in December 2001. Its area is 366.4 km2. Its population was 438,985 in 2018, of which 176,198 in Toulon proper.

Composition
The métropole consists of the following 12 communes:

Carqueiranne
La Crau
La Garde
Hyères
Ollioules
Le Pradet
Le Revest-les-Eaux
Saint-Mandrier-sur-Mer
La Seyne-sur-Mer
Six-Fours-les-Plages
Toulon
La Valette-du-Var

References

Toulon
Toulon